Lonely Girl may refer to:

Music

Albums
 Lonely Girl (album), a 1956 album by Julie London
 Lonely Girl (Jackie DeShannon album), album by Jackie DeShannon, or its title track

Songs
"Lonely Girl", a song by Dala from Everyone Is Someone, 2009
"Lonely Girl", a song by Emmylou Harris from Hard Bargain, 2011
"Lonely Girl", a song by Pink from Missundaztood, 2001
"Lonely Girl", a song by Sandi Thom from Smile... It Confuses People, 2006
"Lonely Girl", a song by Timothy B. Schmit from Playin' It Cool, 1984
"Lonely Girl", a song by Tonight Alive, released in 2013
"Lonely Girl" (Weezer song), released in 2014
"Lonely Girls", a song by Lucinda Williams from Essence, 2001
"Lonely Girls", a song by Suede on their 2002 album A New Morning

See also
"Hey There Lonely Girl", a 1963 song recorded by Eddie Holman
"Lonely Lady", a 1973 song by Joan Armatrading
The Lonely Lady, a 1983 film starring Pia Zadora